Leo Lieberman (12 March 1916 – 31 March 2000) was an American film screenwriter, who co-wrote Sorority Girl and Mad Dog Coll.

Career
Lieberman was a writer for both television and film. His work for television includes episodes of Judd for the Defense, The Human Jungle, The Dakotas (TV series), Wagon Train, and Climax!. His films included Bonzo Goes to College  and Mad Dog Coll, and two films directed by Roger Corman, and Carnival Rock, both released in 1957.

Filmography

Films

Television

References

External links
 
 

1916 births
2000 deaths
20th-century American male writers